The SS Karatta was a steam-powered vessel that operated in South Australian waters. It mainly operated for 54 years between 1907 to 1961. Its last voyage was on 3 November 1961, and it was sold five days later to be broken up. It spent its career carrying goods and passengers between Adelaide, Kingscote (on Kangaroo Island) and Port Lincoln. It was replaced  by the MV Troubridge in 1961.

References

Kangaroo Island
Ferries of South Australia